Noah Powder (born 27 October 1998) is a professional footballer who plays as a defender. Born in the United States, he represents the Trinidad and Tobago national team.

Career
Powder began his career in the New York Red Bulls Academy and trained with the New York Red Bulls first team during the 2015 season. He made his professional debut for the New York Red Bulls II on March 26, 2016 against Toronto FC II. He started the game and played the full match as the Red Bulls II drew the match 2–2. On September 7, 2016, Powder scored his first two goals as a professional in a 4–1 victory over the Harrisburg City Islanders, helping New York to clinch the 2016 USL Regular Season Championship.

On July 14, 2017 Powder signed his first professional contract with New York Red Bulls II. On September 2, 2017, Powder scored his first goal of the season for New York on a free kick a 4–2 victory over Tampa Bay Rowdies.

After the 2017 season ended, it was announced that Powder and Red Bulls II had agreed to mutually part ways.

Powder joined USL side Orange County SC for their 2018 season.

On January 23, 2019, Powder joined USL club Real Monarchs.

On September 24, 2020, it was announced that Powder would move to Real Monarch's MLS side Real Salt Lake for the 2021 season. Following the 2021 season, Powder's contract option was declined by Salt Lake.

Powder signed with Indy Eleven of the USL Championship on January 14, 2022.

On July 5, 2022, Powder was traded to FC Tulsa in exchange for goalkeeper Sean Lewis. He was released by Tulsa following the 2022 season.

International career
Powder is eligible to play for the USA, through birth, or Trinidad and Tobago, through his father, internationally. In 2015, he rejected an approach from the US expressing a preference for remaining part of the T&T international set up.

Powder played for the Trinidad and Tobago national under-17 football team in 2015 serving as team captain. In 2016, he received his first call up to the U20 team.

Career statistics

Honors
New York Red Bulls II
 USL Cup: 2016

Real Monarchs
 USL Cup: 2019

References

External links 
 US Soccer Profile

1998 births
Living people
People from Harrison, New Jersey
Citizens of Trinidad and Tobago through descent
Trinidad and Tobago footballers
Trinidad and Tobago international footballers
Trinidad and Tobago under-20 international footballers
Trinidad and Tobago youth international footballers
2021 CONCACAF Gold Cup players
American soccer players
American sportspeople of Trinidad and Tobago descent
Association football defenders
New York Red Bulls II players
Orange County SC players
Real Monarchs players
Real Salt Lake players
Indy Eleven players
FC Tulsa players
Soccer players from New Jersey
Sportspeople from Hudson County, New Jersey
USL Championship players
Major League Soccer players